Galina Vyacheslavovna Malchugina (born December 17, 1962 in Bryansk) is a retired sprinter from Russia. Competing for the Soviet (later Unified Team, later Russian) relay team, she won medals at the 1988 and 1992 Olympics. In the individual distance 200 metres her success came mostly on European level, although she won a bronze medal at the 1995 World Championships.

Her daughter Yuliya Chermoshanskaya won a gold medal in 4x100 metre relay at the 2008 Summer Olympics but was later stripped of this medal due to doping charges.

Personal bests
100 metres - 10.96 (1992)
200 metres - 22.18 (1996)

International competitions

References

1962 births
Living people
Sportspeople from Bryansk
Soviet female sprinters
Russian female sprinters
Olympic female sprinters
Olympic athletes of the Soviet Union
Olympic athletes of the Unified Team
Olympic athletes of Russia
Olympic silver medalists for the Unified Team
Olympic bronze medalists for the Soviet Union
Olympic silver medalists in athletics (track and field)
Olympic bronze medalists in athletics (track and field)
Athletes (track and field) at the 1988 Summer Olympics
Athletes (track and field) at the 1992 Summer Olympics
Athletes (track and field) at the 1996 Summer Olympics
Medalists at the 1988 Summer Olympics
Medalists at the 1992 Summer Olympics
Goodwill Games medalists in athletics
Competitors at the 1998 Goodwill Games
Competitors at the 1990 Goodwill Games
Universiade gold medalists in athletics (track and field)
Universiade gold medalists for the Soviet Union
Universiade silver medalists for the Soviet Union
Medalists at the 1989 Summer Universiade
World Athletics Championships medalists
World Athletics Championships winners
European Athletics Championships medalists
European Athletics Indoor Championships winners
Soviet Athletics Championships winners
Russian Athletics Championships winners